The Michigan Veterinary Medical Association (MVMA) is a not-for-profit association representing more than 2300 Michigan veterinarians working in private and corporate practice, government, industry, educational institutions, and uniformed services.
 
One of the primary sources of continuing education for veterinarians located in the State of Michigan, the MVMA develops and maintains educational programming for DVMs. As Michigan is one of the few remaining states without mandatory continuing education, the MVMA works with the Michigan Board of Veterinary Medicine, part of the Michigan Department of Licensing and Regulatory Affairs, to develop program guidelines and standards.

In addition to providing information resources and discounts on personal and professional services, the MVMA advocates for veterinary and animal welfare legislation. 
 
The MVMA publishes The Michigan Veterinarian and distributes a monthly educational e-newsletter.

History 

Founded in 1883, the association, through a variety of educational, outreach and advocacy activities, works to advance member development; promote the professional and scientific standards or veterinary medicine; improve the business and work environment for veterinarians; and to serve as the public voice for veterinary medicine in Michigan. MVMA is at the forefront of the effort to educate veterinarians to serve as front-line defenders of the public against zoonotic diseases, which can be transmitted from animals to humans, in order to play a role in maintaining public health and safety.

Involvement in Public Health & Safety 

Due to the increased importance society has placed on the human-animal bond, the MVMA plays an important role in maintaining a network of experts skilled in public health and food animal monitoring and protection.  The MVMA has developed the Michigan State Animal Response Team (MSART); charged with facilitating animal evacuation and care in emergency situations, this is statewide collaborative effort involving a diverse group of qualified veterinarians and other animal welfare experts.

References

External links 

Health care-related professional associations based in the United States
Veterinary medicine-related professional associations
Organizations based in Michigan
Veterinary medicine in the United States